is a 1961 Japanese pseudo-documentary drama film about juvenile delinquents, written and directed by Susumu Hani. It is based on the novel of the same name by Aiko Jinushi.

Plot
After his arrest for theft in a jewelry store, juvenile delinquent Asai is sent to a reform school. He is first assigned to the laundry group, where he is bullied by the group's reckless leaders, before he is allocated to a group of youths manufacturing furniture and experiences solidarity and team spirit. He befriends Debari, who was sentenced for repeated mugging with his gang and urges Asai to wise up and not end like him. Asai is eventually released, facing an uncertain future.

Production and reception
Since Hani had a background in documentaries, he shot Bad Boys, his first feature-length fiction film, in a documentary style, using "nonprofessional actors, black and white, hand-held cinematography, and location shooting." It has been considered one of the films to launch the Japanese New Wave.

A facility was used as the filming location.

Awards
Bad Boys was voted the best film of 1961 in the poll of film critics by Kinema Junpo. Hani was awarded the Directors Guild of Japan New Directors Award, and Toru Takemitsu received the Mainichi Film Award for Best Film Score for his work on Bad Boys and Mozu.

References

External links
 
 
 
 

1961 films
1961 drama films
Japanese drama films
Japanese black-and-white films
Films directed by Susumu Hani
Films scored by Toru Takemitsu
Best Film Kinema Junpo Award winners
1960s Japanese-language films
1960s Japanese films